Bir-e Sofla (also Romanized as Bīr-e Soflá; also known as Karag) is a village in Kahir Rural District, in the Central District of Konarak County, Sistan and Baluchestan Province, Iran. At the 2006 census, its population was 430, in 98 families.

References 

Populated places in Konarak County